Málaga Ahora (Spanish for Málaga Now) is a citizen platform of popular unity, formed as an instrumental party without organic internal life, in order to contest the municipal elections of 2015 in the city of Málaga.

For this project various organizations have converged, the most important being Ganemos Málaga, a citizen platform inspired by Guanyem Barcelona (now called Barcelona en Comú) and the political parties EQUO and Podemos.

History
In June 2014 Ganemos Málaga was presented, supported by the Movement for Democracy, linked to the 15-M Movement. Ganemos Málaga appeared as an horizontal organization, based in district assemblies and supported by political parties and social movements.

The lawyer and activist of the Plataforma de Afectados por la Hipoteca, Ysabel Torralbo was elected as the candidate in the primary elections celebrated between the 9 and the 14 of march in 2015, with the participation of more than 1,000 people.

Electoral performance

City Council of Málaga

References

External links
Official website of Málaga Ahora
Facebook of Málaga Ahora

2015 establishments in Andalusia
Podemos (Spanish political party)
Political parties established in 2015
Political parties in Andalusia
Political party alliances in Spain